James Wadsworth Symington (born September 28, 1927) is an American lawyer and politician who represented Missouri from 1969 to 1977 as a four-term member of the U.S. House of Representatives. Prior to that, in the late 1960s, he served as Chief of Protocol of the United States.

Biography

Youth, family, and education
Symington, son of Stuart (U.S. senator, Missouri) and Evelyn (Wadsworth) Symington, was born on September 28, 1927, in Rochester, New York.  He is the great-grandson of James Wolcott Wadsworth (U.S. Congress, New York) and grandson of James Wolcott Wadsworth Jr. (U.S. Congress, New York) and great-grandson of John Hay. James attended St. Bernard's School in New York City, St. Louis Country Day School in St. Louis, Missouri. In 1945, he graduated from Deerfield Academy in Massachusetts and enlisted in the United States Marine Corps at the age of 17. He served in the Marine Corps as a private first class from 1945 to 1946. Symington earned his Bachelor of Arts degree from Yale University in 1950 where he sang as a member of the Whiffenpoofs and the Glee Club.  He also joined Berzelius secret society (according to the 1950 Yale Banner).  He graduated from Columbia Law School in 1954.

Early legal career and public service
After graduating from law school, Symington served for two years as Assistant City Counselor (1954–1955) for St. Louis. In 1958, Symington entered the United States Foreign Service and was posted to London as assistant to John Hay Whitney, the U.S. ambassador to the United Kingdom and his cousin once removed on his mother's side. He served in this role until 1960, when he returned to private practice in Washington, D.C. He served in a series of roles in government from 1961 to 1968: deputy director, Food for Peace (1961–1962); administrative assistant to Attorney General Robert F. Kennedy (1962–1963); director, President's Committee on Juvenile Delinquency (1965–1966); consultant, President's Commission on Law Enforcement and Administration of Justice (1965–1966); and Chief of Protocol of the United States (1966–1968).

Congressional career
In 1968, Symington was elected as a Democrat to the 91st Congress to represent Missouri's 2nd Congressional District. He served four terms in the U.S. House of Representatives from 1969 to 1977.  While in Congress, he served on the House Commerce Committee and the Committee on Science and Technology, chairing the subcommittees on Space Science and Applications; Science, Research & Technology; and International Cooperation.

In the 1976 election, he chose not to seek his seat for a fifth term; rather, he made an unsuccessful bid for the Democratic nomination to fill the U.S. Senate seat vacated by his father, who retired after serving four terms. He faced Missouri Governor Warren Hearnes and Congressman Jerry Litton in the Democratic primary. Litton won the primary but was killed when his plane crashed en route to the victory party. Hearnes was named the Democratic candidate and ultimately lost to Republican Party candidate John Danforth. At the end of his congressional term, Symington returned to the D.C.-based law firm Smathers, Symington & Herlong as a partner.

Post-congressional roles

Symington served as director of The Atlantic Council from 1986 to 2001, and as director of the Library of Congress Russian Leadership Program in 2001. In 1992, he founded the American-Russian Cultural Cooperation Foundation]], which he chaired from its inception until 2015. Symington was awarded the Order of Friendship by president Vladimir Putin in 2008. He also made occasional appearances as a singer.

Symington appeared as a commentator in the 1990 Ken Burns film The Civil War. As of 2001, he was practicing law with the law firm of Nossaman LLP/O'Connor & Hannan, where he specializes in legislative and administrative representation. Symington is also a writer.  A collection of his poems, songs, and prose, A Muse 'N Washington: Beltway Ballads and Beyond , was published in 1999.

Notes

References
This article incorporates text from the U.S. government publication, Biographical Directory of the United States Congress, 1771-Present.

Further reading

External links

  James W. Symington Papers (1964–1976) at the Western Historical Manuscript Collection, University of Missouri-St. Louis 

1927 births
Living people
United States Marines
United States Marine Corps personnel of World War II
Deerfield Academy alumni
Columbia Law School alumni
Yale University alumni
Politicians from Rochester, New York
Politicians from St. Louis
Democratic Party members of the United States House of Representatives from Missouri
St. Bernard's School alumni
Lawyers from Rochester, New York
Military personnel from Rochester, New York
Wadsworth family
Chiefs of Protocol of the United States
Members of Congress who became lobbyists